Bullet Symphony: Horns and Halos 3 is the sixteenth album by Andre Nickatina, his fourth with Equipto and the third and final in the duos Horns and Halos series. It was released on December 12, 2006 for Fillmoe Coleman Records and was produced by Andre Nickatina, Nick Peace, Freddy Machete, Krushadelic, JustLuv, K-Maxx and One Drop Scott.

Track listing
"A Peez Paradise"- 5:23  
"Ate Miles from the City of Dope"- 3:41  
"Comb My Hair Like"- 3:28  
"Balla Race"- 3:48  
"Y-U-Smilin'"- 3:18  
"Monday Like a Friday" featuring The Jacka- 2:59  
"In My World"- 1:54  
"Da Whip" featuring Shag Nasty- 3:28  
"Purrfect Storm"- 3:15  
"Oh God"- 2:56  
"Rap Candy Bars"- 2:37  
"Pieces of a Broken Man"- 2:56  
"In Yo Eyes"- 2:06

References

2006 albums
Andre Nickatina albums